Gymnelia semicincta is a moth of the subfamily Arctiinae. It was described by William James Kaye in 1910. It is found in Colombia.

References

Gymnelia
Moths described in 1910